Spectral regrowth is the intermodulation products generated in the presence of a digital transmitter added to an analog communication system.

References

Radio electronics